Khyargas Lake is a salt lake in Khyargas district, Uvs Province, Western Mongolia.

Some sources are using different Khyargas Lake statistics values: 
Water level: 1,035.29 m
Surface area: 1,481.1 km2
Average depth: 50.7 m
Volume: 75.2 km³.

The Khyargas Lake National Park is based on the lake. This protected area was established in 2000 and covers about 3,328 km2. It also includes a freshwater Airag Lake.

References

Lakes of Mongolia
Saline lakes of Asia
Protected areas established in 2000
2000 establishments in Mongolia
Uvs Province